Edward Eugene Bogdanski (July 30, 1921 – December 31, 1989) was an American professional basketball player. He played for the Indianapolis Kautskys in the National Basketball League during the 1947–48 season and averaged 1.7 points per game.

References

1921 births
1989 deaths
Amateur Athletic Union men's basketball players
United States Army personnel of World War II
American men's basketball players
Basketball players from Chicago
DePaul Blue Demons men's basketball players
Forwards (basketball)
Indianapolis Kautskys players
Military personnel from Chicago